This article is about the particular significance of the year 1730 to Wales and its people.

Incumbents
Lord Lieutenant of North Wales (Lord Lieutenant of Anglesey, Caernarvonshire, Denbighshire, Flintshire, Merionethshire, Montgomeryshire) – George Cholmondeley, 2nd Earl of Cholmondeley 
Lord Lieutenant of Glamorgan – Charles Powlett, 3rd Duke of Bolton
Lord Lieutenant of Brecknockshire and Lord Lieutenant of Monmouthshire – Sir William Morgan of Tredegar
Lord Lieutenant of Cardiganshire – John Vaughan, 2nd Viscount Lisburne
Lord Lieutenant of Carmarthenshire – vacant until 1755 
Lord Lieutenant of Pembrokeshire – Sir Arthur Owen, 3rd Baronet
Lord Lieutenant of Radnorshire – James Brydges, 1st Duke of Chandos

Bishop of Bangor – Thomas Sherlock
Bishop of Llandaff – John Harris 
Bishop of St Asaph – Francis Hare
Bishop of St Davids – Richard Smalbroke

Events
August - Sir John Glynne succeeds to the family baronetcy, following the deaths of his father and elder brother in successive years.
William Hogarth is commissioned by Robert Jones of Fonmon Castle to paint The Jones Family Conversation Piece.
Construction work is carried out on the north-east wing of Bodysgallen Hall.

Arts and literature

New books
Joseph Harris - A Treatise on Navigation
James Lewis & Christmas Samuel - Y Cyfrif Cywiraf o'r Pechod Gwreiddiol
William Wotton (ed.) - Cyfreithieu Hywel Dda ac eraill, seu Leges Wallicae (Laws of Hywel Dda)

Births
date unknown
, banker (died 1812)
Nathaniel Thomas, writer (died c.1768)

Deaths
16 May - John Evans, clergyman, 50?
19 June - Thomas Trevor, 1st Baron Trevor, politician, 72
August - Sir William Glynne, 5th Baronet, 21
28 November - James Phillips, MP for Carmarthen, 58
December - Owen Gruffydd, poet, 86/87

References

1730 by country
1730 in Great Britain